"Yours Faithfully" is a song by American singer Rebbie Jackson. A mid-tempo R&B jam written and produced by Eliot Kennedy and Pam Sheyne, it is the title track from her fourth album Yours Faithfully and it was released as its first single.

Making a comeback to the music scene after nearly 10 years, Jackson signed to her brother Michael's label MJJ Music, which released the album and the single at the beginning of 1998.

Despite Jackson promoting the release in the United States and Europe, and receiving mostly favourable reviews, the single failed to have much success, peaking at #76 in the US R&B charts, and #76 in the UK charts, this being Jackson's only chart entry in the UK.

In the UK, the single was released as a two-part CD. The b-side was the original extended version of Jackson's 1984 hit Centipede.

Versions
Album Version (4:33)
C&J Single Version (4:06)
Stonebridge Mix (3:45)
Candy Hill House Remix (6:30)

8, the music video directed by Bille Woodruff for the song was filmed, which is Jackson's fourth and last videoclip.

Charts

Rebbie Jackson songs
1998 singles
Songs written by Eliot Kennedy
Songs written by Pam Sheyne
1998 songs
Song recordings produced by Eliot Kennedy